Colobura dirce, the Dirce beauty, mosaic or zebra mosaic, is a butterfly of the family Nymphalidae. It is found in Central America. the Caribbean, and northern South America.

The length of the forewings is about 33 mm.

The larvae feed on Cecropia species.

Subspecies
There are two recognised subspecies:
 C. d. dirce (Linnaeus, 1758)
 C. d. wolcotti Comstock, 1942

References

Coeini
dirce
Butterflies of Central America
Nymphalidae of South America
Butterflies of the Caribbean
Lepidoptera of Bolivia
Lepidoptera of Brazil
Lepidoptera of Colombia
Lepidoptera of Ecuador
Lepidoptera of French Guiana
Fauna of Haiti
Butterflies of North America
Lepidoptera of Peru
Insects of Puerto Rico
Insects of the Dominican Republic
Fauna of Suriname
Butterflies of Trinidad and Tobago
Lepidoptera of Venezuela
Fauna of the Amazon
Butterflies described in 1758
Taxa named by Carl Linnaeus